Frank Hogan (1902–1974) was an American lawyer and politician.

Frank Hogan may also refer to:

 Frank Hogan (footballer) (born 1936), Australian rules footballer
 Frank J. Hogan (1877–1944), American lawyer
 Frank Hogan, Irish man who brings the John 3:7 sign to events